Robert Kousal (born October 7, 1990) is a Czech professional ice hockey forward who is currently playing for HC Dynamo Pardubice in the Czech Extraliga (ELH).

He played with HC Pardubice in the Czech Extraliga during the 2010–11 Czech Extraliga season.

On 27 June 2019, Kousal left Brynäs IF of the Swedish Hockey League and made a return after five and a half years to hometown club, HC Pardubice, on a one-year contract.

References

External links
 

1990 births
Living people
Czech ice hockey forwards
Metallurg Novokuznetsk players
Oshawa Generals players
HC Dynamo Pardubice players
HC Vityaz players
Sportspeople from Pardubice
Czech expatriate ice hockey players in Sweden
Czech expatriate ice hockey players in Canada
Czech expatriate ice hockey players in Russia
Czech expatriate ice hockey players in Switzerland